Bahawalpur is a city in Punjab, Pakistan.

Bahawalpur may also refer to:

Places 
Bahawalpur District, a district in Pakistan
Bahawalpur Tehsil, a tehsil of Bahawalpur district
Bahawalpur (princely state), a former princely state during British Raj
Bahawalpur South Punjab, a geographical region
Bahawalpur Division, administrative unit of Punjab

Transportation

Bahawalpur Airport, an international airport
Bahawalpur railway station, a railway station in Pakistan

Sports
Bahawalpur cricket team, a local team of Bahawalpur district
Bahawalpur Stags, a name of a cricket team

See also
Bahawalpur Regiment, a former group of Pakistan Army
Bahawalpur National Awami Party, a political group in Pakistan